Jeannie Russell (born Jeanne K. Russell; October 22, 1950) is an American actress best known for playing Dennis's playmate, Margaret Wade, in the television series Dennis the Menace, which was based on the Hank Ketcham comic strip of the same name and aired from 1959 to 1963 on CBS.

Russell was chosen at the suggestion of Jay North, who starred in the role of Dennis, to play his nemesis playmate. She appeared in 31 of the series' 146 episodes over the four-year run of the show.

Career
Russell also appeared in other popular TV shows of the era, including The Deputy (1959), Assignment: Underwater (1961), Death Valley Days (1961), and The Dinah Shore Show. Russell provided a singing voice in the 1961 Disney movie Babes in Toyland and made an uncredited appearance in the 1963 popular suspense horror film directed by Alfred Hitchcock, The Birds, in which she played a school child. In 1993, she made a cameo appearance in the film version of Dennis the Menace playing one of the Mitchells' neighbors. In 1971, She moved to St. Louis to filmed the longest running children’s tv show in KETC’s Where will my feet take me today? with Buster Fronto before New York City in 1975 where Mel Winkler is in New York when they’d filming the longest running tv series “Unique New York” together and her last appearance in 1978’s The Letter People - Meet Mister J (1978).
She has done live theater and sound track work, as well as performing as a singer. In the 1990s, Russell was active on the national talk-show and news-feature circuit.

Personal life

Since 1978, Russell has been practicing chiropractic medicine in the North Hollywood/Toluca Lake (California) area. She also counsels and coaches patients, assisting them with "intuitive eating" skills to embrace a healthy lifestyle. Russell had developed a powerful posture building series of movement and strengthening exercises, which draw from her career in show business.

She is also trained in ballet and jazz dance.  North and she occasionally appear together at celebrity events.

Russell co-chaired the Screen Actors Guild  Young Performers' Committee for several years.

Russell is the sister of Bryan Russell, who was also a child actor from 1959 to 1967. She currently resides in the Studio City section of Los Angeles, California.

Filmography

Film 
 Babes in Toyland (1961)
 The Birds (1963)
 Dennis the Menace (1993)

Television 
 The Deputy (TV series)
 Assignment: Underwater
 Death Valley Days
 Dennis the Menace (1959–1963)
 Where will my feet take me today? (1972–1975)
 Unique New York (1976–1978)

References

Further reading

External sources

 
 "Tinseltown Talks: Dennis the Menace’s ‘pain in the neck’ now cures them," by Nick Thomas For The Daily Item, Aug 27, 2015

1950 births
Living people
American child actresses
People from Pasco, Washington
American television actresses
American chiropractors
Actresses from Washington (state)
20th-century American actresses
21st-century American women